The 2007 ATP Buenos Aires was a professional men's tennis tournament that was played on outdoor clay courts at the Buenos Aires Lawn Tennis Club in Buenos Aires, Argentina. It was part of the International Series on the 2007 ATP Tour and was held from 19 February through 26 February 2007. Unseeded Juan Mónaco won the singles title.   

This was the fourth tournament of the season (alongside Adelaide, Viña del Mar, Delray Beach and Las Vegas) that implemented a 24-player Round robin tournament for the singles competition, as part of the round-robin trials proposed during this season.

Singles main draw entrants

Seeds 

 Rankings are as of February 12, 2007.

Other entrants 
The following players received wildcards into the main draw:
  Juan Pablo Guzmán
  Diego Hartfield
  Mariano Zabaleta

The following players received entry from the qualifying draw:
  Carlos Berlocq
  Juan Pablo Brzezicki
  Denis Gremelmayr
  Diego Junqueira

The following players received entry as lucky losers:
  Stefano Galvani (during the elimination round)
  Carlos Berlocq (during the round robin)
  Lukáš Dlouhý (during the round robin)
  Jiří Vaněk (during the round robin)

Withdrawals
During the tournament
  Agustín Calleri (back fibrosis) → replaced by Jiří Vaněk
  Gastón Gaudio (personal reasons) → replaced by Carlos Berlocq
  Nicolás Lapentti (injured) → replaced by Lukáš Dlouhý

Retirements
  José Acasuso (right elbow injury)

Doubles main draw entrants

Seeds 

1 Rankings are as of February 12, 2007.

Other entrants 
The following pairs received wildcards into the main draw:
  Carlos Berlocq /  Brian Dabul
  Eduardo Schwank /  Cristian Villagrán

Withdrawals
  Pablo Cuevas /  Stefano Galvani (walkover)

Finals

Singles

 Juan Mónaco defeated  Alessio di Mauro 6–1, 6–2
 It was Mónaco's 1st title of his career. He would also win other 2 titles during this season, in Pörtschach and Kizbühel.

Doubles

 Martín García /  Sebastián Prieto defeated  Albert Montañés /  Rubén Ramírez Hidalgo 6–4, 6–2
 It was the 7th title for García and the 8th title for Prieto in their respective careers.

References

External links
Official website
ATP tournament profile
Singles draw
Doubles draw

 
ATP Buenos Aires
2007 ATP Tour